Ruth Wagner (born 18 October 1940) is a German politician for the Free Democratic Party (FDP) and was from 1999 to 2003 deputy prime minister of the federal state of Hesse.

Life and politics

Wagner was born 1940 in the German town of Riedstadt and studied at the Goethe University Frankfurt in order to become a teacher.

Wagner entered the liberal FDP in 1971 and became a member of the Landtag of Hesse, the federal state diet of Hesse in 1978 until 1999.
From 1999 to 2003 Wagner headed the Hessian Ministry of Higher Education, Research and the Arts.

References 

Living people
1940 births
Free Democratic Party (Germany) politicians
20th-century German women politicians
21st-century German women politicians
Ministers of the Hesse State Government
Members of the Landtag of Hesse
Goethe University Frankfurt alumni